Hemicloea rogenhoferi, also known as the flattened bark spider, is a species of spider belonging to the family Trochanteriidae. The spider is endemic to the east coast of Australia. It is also naturalised in New Zealand where it has established at sites throughout the North Island and South Island.

Hemicloea rogenhoferi is a moderately large spider with a distinctively flattened body for squeezing into narrow spaces under bark.

References

Gnaphosidae
Spiders of Australia
Spiders of New Zealand
Spiders described in 1875